Zygaena niphona is a species of moth in the Zygaenidae family. It is found in the east Palearctic (Amur Oblast, Korea, Japan). In Seitz it is described Z. niphona Btlr. (= christophi Stgr.) (6e). The only Burnet from East Asia. Rather large, sparsely scaled, 5 spotted , with rather wide red abdominal belt. Club of antenna strongly incrassate at apex. The insect has the appearance of a large meliloti, but the body is strong and robust, the flight however being nevertheless not at all fast. Though the species varies considerably, some specimens being 6 spotted and resembling therefore Z. peucedani, there are no local races. The abdominal belt occupies mostly 2 segments, but is sometimes restricted to one segment, the posterior portion of the abdomen being occasionally all red. The species is widely distributed in Japan , especially at low altitudes of the central mountains, near and on the Fujisan; probably more sporadic in Amurland, since Graeser did not meet with it.

Subspecies
Zygaena niphona Butler, 1877
Z. n. christophi Staudinger, 1887

References

Moths described in 1877
Zygaena